Lucius Nonius Asprenas may refer to:

 Lucius Nonius Asprenas (consul 36 BC), Roman politician and general
 Lucius Nonius Asprenas (suspected poisoner), Roman senator under Augustus
 Lucius Nonius Asprenas (consul 6), son of the senator
 Lucius Nonius Asprenas (consul 29), older son of the consul AD 6
 Nonius Asprenas Calpurnius Torquatus, younger son of the consul AD 6
 Lucius Nonius Calpurnius Torquatus Asprenas (suffect consul), suffect consul circa AD 71
 Lucius Nonius Calpurnius Torquatus Asprenas (fl. 1st century – 2nd century AD), son of the suffect consul circa AD 71, himself consul AD 94 and AD 128